Hawarden railway station serves the village of Hawarden in Flintshire, Wales. It is situated on the Borderlands Line 10½ miles (17 km) north of Wrexham Central and all passenger services are operated by Transport for Wales. The station is unstaffed.

History
The station is located on the "Hawarden Loop" section of the Wrexham, Mold and Connah's Quay Railway and was opened with the line in 1890. It is close to the summit of a steep bank from Shotton, with a ruling gradient of 1 in 53. The station had a goods yard, which closed on 4 May 1964. From 1890 until 2 November 1979, situated at the southern end of the Wrexham-bound platform, a 20-lever signal box was in use.

Facilities
As noted, the station is unmanned and has no ticket machine, so tickets must be purchased on the train or prior to travel.  The former station building is still extant though heavily modified (now used as a private dwelling) and the station also retains its lattice footbridge (plus basic waiting shelters on both platforms).  Train running information is offered via CIS screens and timetable posters.  Step-free access is only possible to the southbound platform (as the footbridge is not accessible).

Services
Services operate every hour each way (Monday to Saturday daytime) between Wrexham Central and Bidston. On weekday evenings & bank holidays, the frequency drops to two-hourly and on Sundays there are departures every 90 minutes each way.

Passengers can change at Bidston for Liverpool, Shotton for North Wales, Chester, and Manchester Piccadilly and at Wrexham General for Shrewsbury, Birmingham New Street,  and South Wales.

Gallery

References

Sources

External links

Railway stations in Flintshire
DfT Category F2 stations
Former Great Central Railway stations
Railway stations in Great Britain opened in 1890
Railway stations served by Transport for Wales Rail